Lee Kyu-Hwan (Hanja: 李奎煥, Keikan Ri; born 14 February 1915) is a South Korean boxer who competed for Japan in the 1936 Summer Olympics.

In 1936 he was eliminated in the first round of the welterweight class after losing his fight to the upcoming gold medalist Sten Suvio.

External links
profile
  

1915 births
South Korean male boxers
Welterweight boxers
Olympic boxers of Japan
Boxers at the 1936 Summer Olympics
Japanese male boxers